Erwin Sick (3 November 1909 in Heilbronn – 3 December 1988) was a German inventor and entrepreneur.

Life and career 

1924 Erwin Sick began his professional career with an apprenticeship in optometry and then attended the College of Optics and Precision Mechanics in Göttingen. In 1932 he got a job at Siemens & Halske, where he initially worked in the computer lab. From 1934 to 1939 Erwin Sick held various positions at Siemens, Bosch and Askania Werke AG initially as a designer and later as an engineer. There he was involved in development projects on color film, cinema technology, astronomical and physical devices.

In 1939 he became head of the Laboratory of Optical Works A&C Steinheil & Söhne, Munich. In 1945 he quit the job and ventured into self-employment. Because he was politically unencumbered, Erwin Sick received his license to "Practice his profession as an engineer"  on 26 September 1946 by the American military government. That was the birth of the company that later became known as Sick AG.

In June 1951 "German Inventors and Innovations Fair" was held in Munich where Sick presented his first finished wooden model of Photoelectric sensor and received a certificate "for creative performance". The successful patent application of the invented Photoelectric sensors and Autocollimation by Erwin Sick on 20 October meant a breakthrough in technical devices and based an entire equipment program.

On 3 December 1988 Erwin Sick died at the age of 79 years after a heart attack.

Also see this video describing his life.

Honors and awards

 In 1971, Erwin Sick received Federal Cross of Merit 1st Class at the 25th anniversary of Sick AG.
 In 1980, the Department of Mechanical Engineering of the Technical University of Munich awarded Erwin Sick an honorary Doctor of Engineering in recognition of his contribution "to scientific and constructive development of optical devices with electronic signal evaluation".
 In 1982, he was awarded the Rudolf-Diesel-Medaille "for his numerous inventions in optoelectronics".

Literature

References 

Businesspeople from Baden-Württemberg
Officers Crosses of the Order of Merit of the Federal Republic of Germany
People from Heilbronn
20th-century German inventors
1909 births
1988 deaths
Place of death missing
Siemens people
Engineers from Baden-Württemberg